Luis Roberto Gneiting Dichtiar (22 February 1968 – 25 July 2018) was a Paraguayan politician.

His parents were Miguel Gneiting and Irene Dichtiar. Prior to his political career, Luis Gneiting was a veterinarian. The younger Gneiting succeeded his father as mayor of Carmen del Paraná in 1997 and served until 1999. In 2008, Luis Gneiting was elected to the Chamber of Deputies. He left the legislature to assume the governorship of Itapúa Department. Gneiting stepped down in 2017, and was appointed Minister of Agriculture and Livestock in May 2018. He died in a plane crash on 25 July 2018, aged 50. Gneiting and deputy agriculture minister Vicente Ramírez were traveling from Ayolas to Asunción.

Gneiting was survived by his second wife Liliana Beatriz Benítez, and children from his first marriage to Delia Edith Floris Cardozo, whom he divorced in April 2012.

References

1968 births
2018 deaths
People from Itapúa Department
Paraguayan people of German descent
Paraguayan people of Ukrainian descent
Colorado Party (Paraguay) politicians
Agriculture ministers of Paraguay
Members of the Chamber of Deputies of Paraguay
Governors of Itapúa Department
Mayors of places in Paraguay
Paraguayan veterinarians
Universidad Nacional de Asunción alumni
Victims of aviation accidents or incidents in Paraguay